Glabrennea thomasseti is a species of the air-breathing land snail, a terrestrial pulmonate gastropod mollusk in the family Streptaxidae.

Its natural habitat is subtropical or tropical moist lowland forests. It is threatened by habitat loss.

Distribution 
Glabrennea thomasseti is endemic to the Mahé Island in the Seychelles.

References

Streptaxidae
Gastropods described in 1909
Taxonomy articles created by Polbot